Heer Sial, sometimes spelled Heer Siyal, is a 1965 Punjabi, Pakistani film directed by Jafar Bokhari, starring Firdous (as Heer) and Akmal (as Ranjha) in title roles. Despite its good musical score, this film did not do good business at the box-office in 1965.

Cast 
 Firdous
 Akmal
 M. Ismail
 Gulrez
 Nasira
 Salma Mumtaz
 Zahur Shah
 Asif Jah
 Sultan Rahi
 M. D. Sheikh
 Imdad Husain

Music and soundtrack

The music is composed by Bakhshi–Wazir with playback singers, Mehdi Hassan, Naseem Begum, Masood Rana, Irene Parveen and Muzaffar. Tanvir Naqvi and Waris Ludhianvi wrote the film song lyrics.

 "Mauj-O-Takht Hazaray Da Chaudhry Si, Mannia Dannia Wich Sarkar Mian" Sung by Mehdi Hassan
 "Chhamkan Naal Mein Lachkaan Paanwan, Kehan Meinun Heer Sial" Sung by Naseem Begum
 "Loko Aimay Nahin Jay Yaar Da Nazara Labhda" Sung by Masood Rana

See also 
 Heer Sial (1938 film)
 Heer Ranjha (1932 film)
 Heer (1955 film)

References 

1965 films
Punjabi-language Pakistani films
Pakistani black-and-white films
1960s Punjabi-language films
Films based on folklore
Heer Ranjha